The anthem for the Monagas State, Venezuela, was written by Idelfonso Núñez; it has music by Carlos Mohle.

Lyrics

References

See also
 List of anthems of Venezuela

Anthems of Venezuela
Spanish-language songs